Thomas Messmer (born 25 November 1979) is a German former professional tennis player.

Messmer won a World Youth Cup (Junior Davis Cup) title with Germany in 1995 and was victorious in all four of his singles matches during the campaign. His only ATP Tour main draw appearances came at Scottsdale in 1998, losing in the first round of the singles to Richard Fromberg. He partnered with Boris Becker in the doubles.

ATP Challenger and ITF Futures finals

Doubles: 6 (1–5)

References

External links
 
 

1979 births
Living people
German male tennis players